The Rotec Rally is a family of American ultralight aircraft that was designed by Bill Adaska in 1977 and produced by Rotec Engineering of Duncanville, Texas. Adaska had been an aeronautical engineer at Bell Helicopter and the French helicopter manufacturer, Aerospatiale, prior to starting Rotec. The aircraft was supplied as a kit for amateur construction.

Design and development
The series all feature a cable-braced high-wing, a single-seat, open cockpit, conventional landing gear and a single engine in pusher configuration. The series was highly successful due to its low price and solid engineering.

The aircraft is made from aluminum tubing, with the flying surfaces covered in Dacron sailcloth. The wing is cable braced from a  single kingpost mounted on top of the wing. The tailwheel is sprung.

The first Rallys were simple powered hang gliders and grew in sophistication as the model numbers increased. More than 2000 Rallys were delivered.

Operational history
In reviewing the Rally, All-Aero said:

Variants
Rally 1
Early powered hang glider model introduced in 1977.
Rally 2
Improved powered hang glider model with weight shift control for pitch and roll with a seat-cable controlled rudder introduced in 1979.
Rally 2B
Development of the Rally 2, with a conventional three-axis control system, including wing-mounted ailerons. In production models after 1981 the ailerons were replaced with spoilers for roll control. The control stick on the Rally 2B is hinged from the top, which simplified control runs to the high wing. Standard engine supplied was the Cuyuna 430 two-stroke.
Rally 3
Two seat version of the Rally 2B, introduced in 1981.
Rally Sport
Structurally strengthened version of the Rally 2B for aerobatics, with a  empty weight,  wingspan and glide ratio of 8:1. Introduced in January 1983.

Aircraft on display
Southern Museum of Flight - Rally 2B

Specifications (Rally 2B)

References

External links
Photo of Rally

1980s United States ultralight aircraft
Homebuilt aircraft
Single-engined pusher aircraft
Rotec Engineering aircraft